"Indonesia Pusaka" is a patriotic song composed by Ismail Marzuki. It is normally played on Indonesian Independence Day celebration.

Lyrics
First verse:

Indonesia tanah air beta
Pusaka abadi nan jaya
Indonesia sejak dulu kala
Tetap dipuja-puja bangsa

Reff:

Di sana tempat lahir beta
Dibuai, dibesarkan bunda
Tempat berlindung di hari tua
Tempat akhir menutup mata

Second verse:

Sungguh indah tanah air beta
Tiada bandingnya di dunia
Karya indah Tuhan Maha Kuasa
Bagi bangsa yang memujanya

Reff:

Indonesia ibu pertiwi
Kau kupuja, kau kukasihi
Tenagaku bahkan pun jiwaku
Kepadamu rela kuberi

Lyrics' Translation in English
First verse:

Indonesia my homeland
everlasting treasure
Indonesia since ancient times
always praised by nations

Reff:

There I was born
Cared for, raised by mother
Place to shelter in old age
Final place to close my eyes

Second verse:

Indonesia, thou art beautiful
No other lands can compare
The work of the LORD Almighty
For a nation that praises Him

Reff:

Indonesia, motherland dear
I adore thee, I love thee
All my strength, my life even
I pledge to thee, my homeland.

Trivia 
 The Song Indonesia Pusaka song by Rossa also used for Closing theme tune which broadcast by SCTV and Indosiar

See also
 Indonesia Raya

Indonesian songs
Indonesian patriotic songs